Sangeeth Nipun Champa Kalhari Jayasekara (born March 26, 1974, Colombo) is a Sri Lankan singer.

Early life and education
Kalhari was born in Colombo, the daughter of a musician and a lecturer in aesthetic university colombo, Sangeet Visharad H.D.S Jayasekara. She is also a mother to Hettiarachchige Don Sanchith Jayasekara born in 2004. She was educated in Visaka Vidyalaya, Colombo and studied music in Bhathkande music college lucknow India. She did Sangeet Visharad in 1994 and Sangeet Nipun in 2015. She currently resides in Nugegoda.

Career
At her selection test conducted by Radio Ceylon in 1980, she performed the song "Sri Lanka Ma Prriyadara Jaya Bhoomi" by Latha Mangeshkar. As a result, she was offered a chance to appear on the children's radio programme Ḷamā Piṭiya ("Children's Field").

She became popular singing Hindi songs. Her first album was called Sathire.  She has released more than twenty albums, most of them Hindi songs. She has performed as a playback singer in movies in the Sinhala language.  She has produced a Sinhala CD with 16 songs.

She was the background singer of famous Sinhala movies, Wadabarinam Wadak Na, Randenigala Sinhaya, Ra Daniyel Dawal Migel, Jonson Gonson , Wije Saha Aje and more.   Sitha Piya Salala  song from Wada Barinam Wadak Na movie, became very famous in 90s.

Kalhari produced a recording of Sinhalese songs in Hindi. With the permission of songwriters Gunadasa Kapuge, Dayaratne Ranatunga and Sanath Nandasiri, she sang their songs in Hindi. Kalhari has also worked as an actress and an announcer. She has acted in thirteen teledramas. She was the announcer for the program Hindi Top Ten aired by Shree FM on Sundays. And in some famous live programmes in Rupawahini. She has also worked as the media and publicity officer in the airport and aviation in Sri Lanka

She released a new Sinhala song  Neth Piyan Piya Innam in 2015, and same song in Hindi language with Indian singer Trideev Borah in 2016 also released yamuna iwure in 2017.

References

Living people
Sinhalese musicians
1974 births
Hindi-language singers
People from Colombo